Saoud al-Sowadi (born April 10, 1988) is a Yemeni football goalkeeper who currently plays for Al-Saqr.

International career
Al-Sowadi was selected to the Yemeni squad for the 2019 AFC Asian Cup.

References

External links 
 
 

Yemeni footballers
Yemen international footballers
1988 births
Living people
Al-Saqr SC players
Al-Wehda SC (Aden) players
Al Yarmuk Al Rawda players
Al-Tilal SC players
2019 AFC Asian Cup players
Yemeni League players

Association football goalkeepers